The MG 335 is a British sailboat, that was designed by Tony Castro and first built in 1986. The design is out of production.

Production
The boat was built by Northshore Yachts in the United Kingdom between 1986 and 1994.

Design
The MG 335 is a small recreational keelboat, built predominantly of glassfibre. It has a fractional sloop rig, an internally-mounted spade-type rudder and a fixed fin keel. It displaces  and carries  of ballast.

The boat is fitted with a Volvo model 2002 diesel engine.

The boat has a PHRF racing average handicap of 138 with a high of 138 and low of 138.

The MG 335 design was developed into the CS 34 in 1989, also designed by Castro and built by CS Yachts in Canada. The CS 34 differs in that it has a taller mast with a masthead rig and higher displacement than the MG 335.

See also
List of sailing boat types

Related development
CS 34
Similar sailboats
Catalina 34

References

Keelboats
1980s sailboat type designs
Sailing yachts
Sailboat type designs by Tony Castro
Sailboat types built by Northshore Yachts